Willibald Schmaus (16 June 1912 – 27 April 1979) was an Austrian football defender. He represented both Austria and Germany internationally.

Career
He earned 14 caps for the Austria national football team and participated in the 1934 FIFA World Cup. After the annexation of Austria by Germany, he earned 10 caps for the Germany national football team, and participated in the 1938 FIFA World Cup. He spent his club career at First Vienna FC 1894.

References

External links

1912 births
1979 deaths
Footballers from Vienna
Association football defenders
Austrian footballers
Austria international footballers
German footballers
Germany international footballers
First Vienna FC players
1934 FIFA World Cup players
1938 FIFA World Cup players
Dual internationalists (football)